Wang Chiu-chiang (pronounced ; born 1957 in Santai, Mianyang, Sichuan), also known as  (Wang Jiujiang), is a Sichuanese painter whose work is mostly based on the landscapes of Sichuan and Tibet, by reinterpreting the traditional shan-shui style. He is classified as a member of national first-class artists.

Career 

Wang lived in Tibet in the 1980s, where he worked as an art director for the military district of Tibet. In 1982, he created the illustrations for two picture books recounting the Tibetan folklores, The Story of Akhu Tönpa and The Swan. The latter won a second prize in the Exhibition of Fine Arts of the Tibet Autonomous Region. In 1986, with The Eternity, a wood carving painting, he was awarded the Creative Excellence Award in the fifth Exhibition of Fine Arts of Tibet; and several of his sketches were published in the Tibetan newspaper Lhasa Evening, in the same year.

His work The Celestial Burial won the Prize of Honour in the National Competition of Genre Painting in 1988; and Autumn Melody in the Mountains of Aba won a third prize in the Great Contest of Chinese Paintings held in Shenzhen, in 1989. His work High Autumn, for which he received an award of excellence in 1993, has been accepted and accessioned into the collection of the Sichuan Academy of Poetry, Calligraphy, and Painting. In 2002, The Golden Plateau, a shan-shui style painting, was exhibited at the National Exhibition of Chinese Paintings.

In 2003, he was awarded for the work Sutra-chanting (aka Praying, 220 cm × 126 cm)—a 'neo-shanshui' style painting—with the Excellence Award from China Artists Association, while on display in the National Exhibition of Chinese Paintings on West China Scenery.

In 2018, Cloud-wrapped Mountains over the Tieh-hsi Lake, a painting made in a relatively more traditional shan-shui style, was presented in the first Exhibition of Fine Arts of Mianyang. He also participates each year in the Ink and Wash Fucheng Invitational Art Exhibition, an annual exhibition held in Fucheng District, Mianyang.

In addition to shan-shui paintings, he also created gouaches, oil paintings, and some abstract expressionist works during his years as a young adult. And he is also an antique collector.

Critique 
Zhang Shiying, a professional painter from Canton, when speaking of the artworks of Wang, stating: 'A sensation of freshness, due to the spacious view and free spirit; a sensation of brightness, due to the absence of desolation and melancholy'.

Gallery

References

External links 

1957 births
Chinese landscape painters
20th-century Chinese painters
21st-century Chinese painters
Painters from Sichuan
People from Mianyang
Living people